Clostridium amazonense  is a Gram-positive, strictly anaerobic, rod-shaped and spore-forming bacterium from the genus Clostridium which has been isolated from human feces in Nuevo Eden in Peru.

References

 

Bacteria described in 2015
amazonense